The Chrysler 3.3 and 3.8 engines are V6 engines  used by Chrysler from  1989 to 2011
This engine family was Chrysler's first 60° V6 engine designed and built in-house for front wheel drive vehicles, and their first V6 not based on a V8. It was designed as a larger, more powerful alternative to the Mitsubishi 3.0 V6 in the minivans and debuted in 1989 for the 1990 model year. They were later also used in some rear wheel drive cars like the Jeep Wrangler.

The 3.3 was dropped after 2010 with the Chrysler minivans, and the 3.8 was dropped after 2011 with the Jeep Wrangler, ending 22 years in production.

Specifications

History
The original 3.3 engine, as well as the larger 3.8, are pushrod engine designs. The 3.3 was introduced in 1989 with the 1990 Chrysler Imperial, New Yorker, and related K-series models, and was joined in 1991 by the 3.8. Production on the 3.3 was stopped in 2010 after a run of 5,076,603 engines, while the 3.8 remained in production until May 2011 in Trenton, Michigan for the Jeep Wrangler. Both use a cast iron block and aluminum heads.

3.3
In 1994, the 3.3 received a  increase in power to  due to a new air intake. The engine was especially suited for transverse applications in Chrysler's minivans, but was also used in a longitudinal front-wheel-drive setup on 1993-1997 LH platform cars. It was last used in 2010 for Chrysler minivans before the introduction of the new 3.6 L Pentastar engine for the 2011 model year.

Designated EGA, the 3.3 was built at Trenton Engine in Trenton, Michigan. It uses Sequential fuel injection, has roller tappets and features forged steel connecting rods, a one-piece cast camshaft, and either a cast aluminum or reinforced plastic intake manifold. The 3.3 has a timing chain, and is an interference engine meaning that the valves will collide with the pistons in the event of a timing chain failure.

Vehicles using the 3.3 include:
1990–1993 Dodge Dynasty, Chrysler New Yorker, Chrysler Imperial, (replaced the 3.0 L Mitsubishi 6G72 engine)
1990–2010 Chrysler minivans
1993–1997 Chrysler Concorde/Dodge Intrepid/Eagle Vision

3.8

This EGH version was also built at Trenton Engine in Trenton, MI.

Vehicles using the 3.8 include:
1991–1993 Chrysler New Yorker and Chrysler Imperial , 
1994–2010 Chrysler minivans
2007–2011 Jeep Wrangler (JK) 
2009–2010 Volkswagen Routan

SOHC

A single overhead camshaft was an addition to the lineup for 1993. Introduced with the 3.5 L engine, this design spawned the DOHC 2.7 L Chrysler LH engine, as well as the 3.2 L and 4.0 L variants.

References

See also
List of Chrysler engines

3.3
V6 engines